The Napier railway station in Napier, New Zealand was the main railway station in Napier and an intermediate stop on the Palmerston North–Gisborne Line. On 12 October 1874 the station and the first section of the line south from Napier to Hastings was opened. The line through the Manawatu Gorge to Palmerston North and hence to Wellington was opened on 9 March 1891. The first train carrying passengers had been organised by the contractors, John Brogden and Sons, on Tuesday 30 June 1874 to run from Napier to Waitangi.

Construction commenced on a line north of Napier in 1912, first reaching Eskdale in 1922 after a series of delays and finally reaching Gisborne on 3 August 1942; passenger services commenced on 7 September. Napier was the terminus for both Gisborne and Wellington goods trains, though some passenger trains ran straight through, such as the Endeavour express. This section north was mothballed in 2012.

The original Napier station building was on the corner of Station Street and Millar Street, close to the centre of Napier. The facilities on the site increased to include the passenger station plus a goods yard, locomotive depot, workshop, and a way and works (maintenance) depot. The line was on a curve and difficult to work, and the site was limited by level crossings at each end and with no room for expansion.

To alleviate overcrowding, the way and works depot and most other functions were moved to Pandora Point at the start of the Ahuriri Branch during a two-year programme across 1989–91. Afterwards, only a new InterCity coach and train terminal remained on the city site, fronting Munroe Street. The old station was closed on 6 October 1990, with a new station opened on 9 June 1991. The former station and three-storey administrative block built in the late 1950s and early 1960s were demolished, making three hectares of land available for retail development.

A marshalling yard, freight terminal, locomotive depot, and other facilities were established at Pandora Point, with a triangle provided to turn trains and giving direct access north and south from the port branch. The Ahuriri yard was closed. The old main line north to Gisborne was realigned to the east to allow a new link road to the Tamatea area of Napier, and railways land was redeveloped as an industrial subdivision.

The Bay Express replaced the Endeavour in December 1989. The Endeavour had not run between Napier and Gisborne since March 1988, and the Bay Express likewise terminated at Napier. It was cancelled on 7 October 2001. The Bay Express was the last regular passenger service to use the station, but heritage excursion services visit the station multiple times each year.

Te Awa railway station 
Te Awa was a siding, opened as Napier South on 6 June 1926, renamed on 1 April 1930 and closed on 29 November 1949. There was a sign, but no building at the station.

Railway Workshops 
Napier had a locomotive works until 1929, when much of its work was transferred to Hutt Workshops and staff were cut from 107 to 30, many being transferred south. Building started in 1881 and the works started in 1883. By 1884 the works had  x  fitting and repairing shop, a  x  machine shop, a  x  smithy,  x  boiler shop,  x  sawmill and a   x  carriage and wagon workshop. A 1924 report recommended closing the locomotive works.

A new diesel depot was built in 1975.

References

Citations

Bibliography

It’s all change at Napier; Rails, October 1990, Volume 20 No 3 pp. 52–54

External links 

 Photo of 1960 demolition
 Photo of 1961 station

Rail transport in the Hawke's Bay Region
Railway stations in New Zealand
Buildings and structures in Napier, New Zealand
Railway stations opened in 1874